Hadley Robinson (born January 1995) is an American actress. She studied at Juilliard School. Her roles include the box office hit Little Women (2019), where she plays Sallie Gardiner Moffat, the television series Utopia (2020) in the recurring roles of Charlotte and Lily, and in Moxie (2021) as the lead, Vivian. 

She plays the role of Jeanie Buss in the HBO series Winning Time: The Rise of the Lakers Dynasty.

She is currently cast in the upcoming movie The Boys in the Boat.

Filmography

Films

Television

Short

Self

Soundtrack

References

21st-century American actresses
1995 births
Living people
Juilliard School alumni

External links